DJB may refer to:

 Daniel J. Bernstein (born 1971), American mathematician.
 DJB Foundation
 Enough is Enough (Dosta je bilo), a political party in Serbia
 IATA code for Sultan Thaha Airport
 German Judo Federation (Deutscher Judo-Bund)